The Table Bay Nature Reserve is an  nature reserve in Milnerton, Western Cape, South Africa. It consists of several smaller constituent reserves including Rietvlei Wetland Reserve, Diep River Fynbos Corridor, Zoarvlei Wetlands, Milnerton Racecourse Nature Reserve, and Milnerton Lagoon, as well as surrounding protected areas. These adjacent reserves were amalgamated on 27 June 2012, in order to improve the biodiversity management in the built-up area. It is managed by the City of Cape Town's Environmental Resource Management Department, with offices at Rietvlei.

The Table Bay Nature Reserve forms the southernmost buffer area of the Cape West Coast Biosphere Reserve, and links it to the edge of Cape Town's city centre. It also contains a large portion of the critically endangered lowland habitats remaining in Cape Town.

The central feature in the Table Bay Nature Reserve is the Rietvlei wetland system. The Rietvlei Wetlands and Milnerton Lagoon were proclaimed as a Nature Area on 3 August 1984, in proclamation number 1632 of Provincial Gazette No. 9345. The Nature Reserve is partly owned by the City of Cape Town and the World Wildlife Fund for Nature – South Africa, who own two of the Erven. The City of Cape Town manages these two Erven on a 99-year lease for the purposes of nature conservation.

Biodiversity 
Fauna and flora in the reserve include the following:

Mammals

Indigenous 
Bathyergidae
Bathyergus suillus (Cape dune mole-rat)
Cryptomys hottentotus (common mole-rat)
Georychus capensis (Cape mole-rat)
Bovidae
Raphicerus campestris (steenbok)
Raphicerus melanotis (Cape grysbok)
Sylvicapra grimmia (common duiker)
Canidae
Vulpes chama (Cape fox)
Chrysochloridae
Cryptochloris asiatica a.k.a. Chrysochloris asiatica (Cape golden mole)
Felidae
Felis caracal (caracal)
Herpestidae
Atilax paludinosus (water mongoose)
Cynictis penicillata (yellow mongoose)
Galerella pulverulenta (Cape gray mongoose)
Herpestes ichneumon (Egyptian mongoose)
Hystricidae
Hystrix africaeaustralis (Cape porcupine)
Leporidae
Lepus capensis (Cape hare)
Lepus saxatilis (scrub hare)
Muridae
Dendromus melanotis (gray climbing mouse)
Mus musculus (house mouse)
Otomys irroratus (vlei rat)
Otomys unisulcatus (bush vlei rat)
Rattus rattus (black rat)
Rhabdomys pumilio (striped field mouse)
Tatera afra (Cape gerbil)
Mus indutus (desert pygmy mouse)
Mustelidae;
Aonyx capensis (Cape clawless otter)
Mellivora capensis (honey badger)
Soricidae
Myosorex varius (forest shrew)
Vespertilionidae
Eptesicus capensis (Cape serotine bat)
Viverridae
Genetta genetta (small-spotted genet)
Genetta tigrina (Cape genet)

Introduced 
Canidae
Canis lupus familiaris a.k.a. Canis familiaris (domestic dog)
Felidae
Felis silvestris catus a.k.a. Felis catus (domestic cat)

Reptiles 

Chamaeleonidae
Bradypodion pumilum (Cape dwarf chameleon)
Bradypodion occidentale (Namaqua dwarf chameleon)

Colubridae
Psammophylax rhombeatus (rhombic skaapsteker)
Crotaphopeltis hotamboeia (herald snake)
Dasypeltis scabra (common eggeater)
Dispholidus typus (boomslang)
Duberria lutrix lutrix (common slugeater)
Lamprophis aurora (Aurora house snake)
Lamprophis fuscus (yellow-bellied house snake)
Lamprophis inornatus (olive house snake)
Lycodonomorphus rufulus (common brown water snake)
Psammophis crucifer (cross-marked grass snake), (crossmarked grass snake)
Psammophis leightoni (Cape sand snake)
Psammophis notostictus (Karoo sand snake)
Pseudaspis cana (mole snake)
Chamaesaura anguina (Cape grass lizard)

Elapidae
Homoroselaps lacteus (spotted harlequin snake)
Naja nivea (Cape cobra)

Gekkonidae
Afrogecko porphyreus (marbled leaf-toed gecko), (marbled leaftoed gecko)
Pachydactylus geitje (ocellated thick-toed gecko), (ocellated thicktoed gecko)

Gerrhosauridae
Gerrhosaurus flavigularis (yellow-throated plated lizard)

Lacertidae
Meroles knoxii (Knox's desert lizard)

Leptotyphlopidae
Leptotyphlops nigricans (black thread snake)

Pelomedusidae
Pelomedusa subrufa (marsh terrapin)

Scincidae
Acontias meleagris meleagris (Cape legless skink)
Scelotes bipes (silvery dwarf burrowing skink)
Trachylepis capensis (Cape skink)
Typhlosaurus caecus (Cuvier's blind legless skink)
Trachylepis homalocephala (red-sided skink), (redsided skink)

Testudinidae
Chersina angulata (angulate tortoise)
Homopus areolatus (parrot-beaked tortoise), (parrotbeaked tortoise)

Typhlopidae
Rhinotyphlops lalandei (Delalande's beaked blind snake), (Delalande's blind snake)

Viperidae
Bitis armata (southern adder)

Amphibians 

Brevicipitidae
Breviceps rosei (sand rain frog)

Bufonidae
Vandijkophrynus angusticeps (sand toad)
Amietophrynus pantherinus (western leopard toad) endangered (EN)
Amietophrynus rangeri (raucous toad)

Pipidae
Xenopus laevis (common platanna)

Pyxicephalidae bonaparte
Cacosternum platys (caco) sp., (flat caco)
Strongylopus grayii grayii (clicking stream frog)
Tomopterna delalandii (Cape sand frog)
Amietia fuscigula (Cape river frog)

Fish

Indigenous 
Anabantidae
Sandelia capensis (Cape kurper)

Anguillidae
Anguilla mossambica steinitzi (longfin eel)

Clupeidae
Gilchristella aestuaria (estuarine round-herring)

Galaxiidae
Galaxias zebratus (Cape galaxias)

Gobiidae
Caffrogobius nudiceps (barehead goby)

Mugilidae
Liza richardsonii (southern mullet)
Mugil cephalus (flathead mullet)

Sparidae
Lithognathus lithognathus (white steenbras)
Rhabdosargus globiceps (white stumpnose)

Introduced 
Cichlidae
Oreochromis mossambicus (Mozambique tilapia)
Tilapia sparrmanii (banded tilapia)

Clariidae
Clarias gariepinus (sharp-tooth catfish)

Cyprinidae
Cyprinus carpio (carp)

Poeciliidae
Gambusia affinis (mosquitofish)

Birds 

Accipitridae
Buteo rufofuscus (jackal buzzard)
Buteo vulpinus (steppe buzzard)
Circus ranivorus (African marsh-harrier) vulnerable (VU)
Elanus caeruleus (black-winged kite)
Haliaeetus vocifer (African fish eagle)
Milvus migrans (black kite), (yellow-billed kite)
Accipiter melanoleucus (black sparrowhawk)

Acrocephalidae
Acrocephalus scirpaceus (Common reed warbler)
Acrocephalus gracilirostris (lesser swamp warbler)

Alaudidae
Calandrella cinerea (red-capped lark)

Alcedinidae
Alcedo cristata (malachite kingfisher)

Anatidae
Alopochen aegyptiacus (Egyptian goose), (Kolgans)
Anas capensis (Cape teal)
Anas erythrorhyncha (red-billed teal)
Anas platyrhynchos (mallard)
Anas smithii (Cape shoveler)
Anas sparsa (African black duck)
Anas undulata (yellow-billed duck)
Plectropterus gambensis (spur-winged goose)
Spatula hottentota (blue-billed teal)
Netta erythrophthalma (southern pochard)
Oxyura maccoa (Maccoa duck) near threatened (NT)
Sarkidiornis melanotos (Knob-billed duck)
Tadorna cana (South African shelduck)

Anhingidae
Anhinga rufa (African darter)

Apodidae
Apus affinis (little swift)
Apus barbatus (African black swift)
Apus caffer (white-rumped swift)
Tachymarptis melba (Alpine swift)

Ardeidae
Ardea cinerea (grey heron)
Ardea melanocephala (black-headed heron)
Ardea purpurea (purple heron)
Bubulcus ibis (cattle egret)
Egretta garzetta (little egret)
Egretta intermedia (yellow-billed egret)
Ixobrychus minutus (little bittern)
Nycticorax nycticorax (black-crowned night heron)
Ardea goliath (Goliath heron)
Egretta alba (great egret)

Caprimulgidae
Caprimulgus pectoralis (fiery-necked nightjar)

Centropodidae
Centropus burchelli (Burchell's coucal)

Cerylidae
Ceryle rudis (pied kingfisher)
Megaceryle maximus (giant kingfisher)

Charadriidae
Charadrius tricollaris (three-banded plover)
Vanellus armatus (blacksmith lapwing), (blacksmith plover)
Charadrius pecuarius (Kittlitz's plover)
Vanellus coronatus (crowned lapwing)
Charadrius hiaticula (common ringed plover)
Charadrius marginatus (white-fronted plover)
Charadrius pallidus (chestnut-banded plover) near threatened (NT)
Pluvialis squatarola (grey plover)

Chionidae
Burhinus capensis (spotted thick-knee), (spotted dikkop)
Burhinus vermiculatus (water thick-knee), (water dikkop)

Ciconiidae
Ciconia ciconia (white stork)
Ciconia nigra (black stork) near threatened (NT)
Mycteria ibis (yellow-billed stork)

Cisticolidae
Apalis thoracica (bar-throated apalis)
Cisticola tinniens (Levaillant's cisticola)
Prinia maculosa (Karoo prinia)
Cisticola juncidis (zitting cisticola)
Cisticola subruficapilla (grey-backed cisticola)
Cisticola textrix (cloud cisticola)

Coliidae
Colius colius (white-backed mousebird)
Colius striatus (speckled mousebird)
Urocolius indicus (red-faced mousebird)

Columbidae
Columba livia (feral pigeon), (rock dove)
Oena capensis (Namaqua dove)
Streptopelia capicola (Cape turtle dove)
Streptopelia semitorquata (red-eyed dove)
Streptopelia senegalensis (Lag Duifie), (laughing dove)
Columba guinea (speckled pigeon)

Corvidae
Corvus albus (pied crow)
Corvus splendens (Indian house crow)
Corvus albicollis (white-necked raven)

Cuculidae
Chrysococcyx caprius (Diderick cuckoo)
Chrysococcyx klaas (Klaas's cuckoo)
Clamator jacobinus (Jacobin cuckoo)

Dendrocygnidae
Dendrocygna viduata (white-faced duck)
Thalassornis leuconotus (white-backed duck)
Dendrocygna bicolor (fulvous duck)

Estrildidae
Estrilda astrild (common waxbill)

Falconidae
Falco biarmicus (Lanner falcon) near threatened (NT)
Falco rupicolus (rock kestrel)
Falco peregrinus (peregrine falcon) near threatened (NT)

Fringillidae
Serinus canicollis (Cape canary)
Crithagra flaviventris (yellow canary)
Emberiza capensis (Cape bunting)
Crithagra albogularis (white-throated canary)
Serinus sulphuratus (brimstone canary)

Gruidae
Anthropoides paradiseus (blue crane) vulnerable (VU)

Haematopodidae
Haematopus moquini (African black oystercatcher) near threatened (NT)

Heliornithidae
Fulica cristata (red-knobbed coot)
Gallinula chloropus (common moorhen)
Porphyrio madagascariensis (African purple swamphen)

Hirundinidae
Hirundo albigularis (white-throated swallow)
Hirundo cucullata (greater striped swallow)
Hirundo dimidiata (pearl-breasted swallow)
Hirundo rustica (barn swallow)
Riparia paludicola (brown-throated martin)
Delichon urbicum (common house-martin)
Hirundo fuligula (rock martin)
Riparia cincta (banded martin)
Hirundo spilodera (South African cliff-swallow)

Indicatoridae
Indicator indicator (greater honeyguide)

Laniidae
Lanius collaris (southern fiscal), (fiscal shrike)

Laridae
Larus cirrocephalus (grey-headed gull)
Larus dominicanus (kelp gull)
Larus hartlaubii (Hartlaub's gull)
Chlidonias hybrida (whiskered tern)
Chlidonias leucopterus (white-winged tern)
Sterna balaenarum (Damara tern) near threatened (NT)
Sterna bergii (swift tern)
Sterna caspia (Caspian tern) near threatened (NT)
Sterna hirundo (common tern)
Sterna sandvicensis (Sandwich tern)
Sterna vittata (Antarctic tern)

Locustellidae
Bradypterus baboecala (little rush warbler)

Lybiidae
Tricholaema leucomelas (acacia pied barbet)

Macrosphenidae
Sphenoeacus afer (Cape grassbird)

Meropidae
Merops apiaster (European bee-eater)

Monarchidae
Laniarius ferrugineus (southern boubou)
Telophorus zeylonus (bokmakierie)

Motacillidae
Anthus cinnamomeus (African pipit)
Macronyx capensis (Cape longclaw)
Motacilla capensis (Cape wagtail)

Muscicapidae
Cossypha caffra (Cape robin-chat)
Saxicola torquatus (African stonechat)
Sigelus silens (fiscal flycatcher)
Turdus olivaceus (olive thrush)
Cercomela familiaris (familiar chat)
Cercotrichas coryphaeus (Karoo scrub-robin)
Oenanthe pileata (capped wheatear)

Nectariniidae
Cinnyris chalybeus (southern double-collared sunbird)
Nectarinia famosa (malachite sunbird)

Passeridae
Passer melanurus (Cape sparrow)
Passer domesticus (house sparrow)
Passer diffusus (southern grey-headed sparrow)

Pelecanidae
Pelecanus onocrotalus (great white pelican), (Wit pelikan) near threatened (NT)

Phalacrocoracidae
Phalacrocorax africanus (reed cormorant)
Phalacrocorax capensis (Cape cormorant) near threatened (NT)
Phalacrocorax lucidus (white-breasted cormorant)
Phalacrocorax coronatus (crowned cormorant) near threatened (NT)

Phasianidae
Numida meleagris (helmeted guineafowl)
Pternistis capensis (Cape spurfowl)
Scleroptila africanus (grey-winged francolin)
Coturnix coturnix (common quail)

Phoenicopteridae
Phoenicopterus minor (lesser flamingo) near threatened (NT)
Phoenicopterus ruber (greater flamingo) near threatened (NT)

Phylloscopidae
Phylloscopus trochilus (willow warbler)

Ploceidae
Euplectes capensis (yellow bishop)
Euplectes orix (southern red bishop)
Ploceus capensis (Cape weaver)
Ploceus velatus (southern masked-weaver)

Podicipedidae
Podiceps cristatus (great crested grebe)
Podiceps nigricollis (black-necked grebe)
Tachybaptus ruficollis (little grebe)

Pycnonotidae
Pycnonotus capensis (Cape bulbul)

Rallidae
Amaurornis flavirostris (black crake)
Sarothrura rufa (red-chested flufftail)
Porzana pusilla (Baillon's crake)
Rallus caerulescens (African rail)

Recurvirostridae
Himantopus himantopus (black-winged stilt)
Recurvirostra avosetta (pied avocet)

Rostratulidae
Rostratula benghalensis (greater painted-snipe) near threatened (NT)

Scolopacidae
Gallinago nigripennis (African snipe), (Ethiopian snipe)
Philomachus pugnax (ruff)
Tringa nebularia (common greenshank)
Tringa stagnatilis (marsh sandpiper)
Actitis hypoleucos (common sandpiper)
Arenaria interpres (ruddy turnstone)
Calidris alba (sanderling)
Calidris canutus (red knot)
Calidris ferruginea (curlew sandpiper)
Calidris melanotos (pectoral sandpiper)
Calidris minuta (little stint)
Limosa lapponica (bar-tailed godwit)
Numenius arquata (Eurasian curlew)
Numenius phaeopus (common whimbrel)
Steganopus tricolor (Wilson's phalarope)
Tringa glareola (wood sandpiper)
Tringa totanus (common redshank)

Scopidae
Scopus umbretta (hamerkop)

Strigidae
Bubo africanus (spotted eagle-owl)
Asio capensis (marsh owl)

Sturnidae
Onychognathus morio (red-winged starling)
Sturnus vulgaris (common starling), (European starling)
Spreo bicolor (pied starling)

Sylviidae
Sylvia subcoerulea (chestnut-vented warbler)

Threskiornithidae
Bostrychia hagedash (hadeda ibis)
Platalea alba (African spoonbill)
Plegadis falcinellus (glossy ibis)
Threskiornis aethiopicus (African sacred ibis)

Tytonidae
Tyto alba (barn owl)

Upupidae
Upupa africana (African hoopoe)

Viduidae
Vidua macroura (pin-tailed whydah)

Zosteropidae
Zosterops virens (Cape white-eye)

Plants

Indigenous 

Aizoaceae
Tetragonia fruticosa
Galenia africana
Tetragonia decumbens (sea spinach)
Tetragonia spicata
Acrosanthes humifusa
Aizoon sarmentosum
Amaranthaceae
Alternanthera sessilis
Atriplex cinerea
Atriplex semibaccata
Salicornia meyeriana
Salicornia perennis (syn. Sarcocornia perennis)
Sarcocornia capensis
Sarcocornia natalensis
Sarcocornia pillansii
Chenopodium murale
Exomis microphylla
Amaryllidaceae
Ammocharis longifolia
Brunsvigia orientalis (candelabra flower)
Haemanthus coccineus
Haemanthus pubescens pubescens
Haemanthus sanguineus
Anacardiaceae
Rhus glauca 
Rhus crenata , (turkeyberry)
Rhus laevigata
Rhus lancea
Rhus lucida
Rhus tomentosa
Schinus molle
Chlorophytum undulatum
Apiaceae
Dasispermum suffruticosum
Sonderina hispida
Sonderina tenuis
Capnophyllum africanum
Stoibrax capense
Torilis arvensis
Lichtensteinia obscura
Apocynaceae
Cynanchum africanum
Carissa macrocarpa
Microloma sagittatum
Gomphocarpus physocarpus
Eustegia filiformis
Aponogetonaceae
Aponogeton angustifolius
Aponogeton distachyos
Araceae
Zantedeschia aethiopica
Asparagaceae
Asparagus capensis
Asparagus lignosus
Asparagus rubicundus
Asparagus asparagoides
Asphodelaceae
Aloe sp.1
Trachyandra filiformis
Trachyandra ciliata
Trachyandra divaricata
Bulbine lagopus
Trachyandra brachypoda
Trachyandra muricata
Trachyandra revoluta
Asteraceae
Athanasia crithmifolia
Chrysanthemoides incana
Dimorphotheca pluvialis
Senecio burchellii
Amellus asteroides
Amellus tenuifolius
Arctotheca calendula
Arctotheca populifolia
Arctotis hirsuta
Arctotis stoechadifolia
Athanasia dentata
Athanasia trifurcata
Berkheya rigida
Chrysanthemoides monilifera (bitoubos)
Cineraria geifolia
Cotula coronopifolia
Cotula eckloniana
Cotula filifolia
Cotula turbinata
Dicerothamnus rhinocerotis
Didelta carnosa
Eriocephalus africanus
Eriocephalus racemosus
Felicia tenella
Helichrysum niveum
Helichrysum patulum
Helichrysum revolutum
Leysera gnaphalodes
Metalasia muricata
Nidorella foetida
Oncosiphon suffruticosum
Osteospermum junceum
Othonna coronopifolia
Plecostachys serpyllifolia
Senecio elegans
Senecio halimifolius 
Senecio littoreus
Senecio rosmarinifolius
Seriphium plumosum
Steirodiscus tagetes
Xanthium strumarium
Helichrysum cymosum
Hypochaeris radicata
Lactuca serriola
Sonchus oleraceus
Cotula vulgaris
Dimorphotheca sinuata
Helichrysum helianthemifolium
Othonna filicaulis
Petalacte coronata
Senecio arenarius
Senecio hastatus
Senecio pubigerus
Stoebe capitata
Trichogyne repens
Brassicaceae
Heliophila africana
Raphanus raphanistrum (wild mustard)
Campanulaceae
Wahlenbergia capensis
Wahlenbergia androsacea
Caryophyllaceae
Silene pilosellifolia
Spergularia media
Celastraceae
Pterocelastrus tricuspidatus
Putterlickia pyracantha
Gymnosporia heterophylla
Ceratophyllaceae
Ceratophyllum demersum
Colchicaceae
Androcymbium eucomoides
Ornithoglossum viride
Androcymbium capense
Convolvulaceae
Cuscuta nitida
Falkia repens
Ipomoea purpurea
Crassulaceae
Cotyledon orbiculata
Tylecodon grandiflorus
Crassula cymosa
Crassula dichotoma
Crassula glomerata
Crassula vaillantii
Crassula fallax
Crassula flava
Cucurbitaceae
Kedrostis nana
Cyperaceae
Bolboschoenus maritimus
Schoenoplectus scirpoides
Carex sp.1
Cyperus textilis
Ficinia indica
Ficinia nigrescens
Ficinia nodosa
Hellmuthia membranacea
Ebenaceae
Euclea racemosa
Euclea undulata
Ericaceae
Erica subdivaricata
Euphorbiaceae
Euphorbia burmannii
Euphorbia caput-medusae
Euphorbia mauritanica
Euphorbia peplus
Euphorbia helioscopia
Euphorbia sp.1
Fabaceae
Aspalathus hispida
Dipogon lignosus
Indigofera complicata
Lessertia rigida
Lessertia sp.1
Psoralea repens
Rhynchosia ferulifolia
Senna didymobotrya
Medicago polymorpha
Otholobium hirtum
Spartium junceum
Sutherlandia frutescens
Aspalathus acanthophylla
Aspalathus cymbiformis
Aspalathus ternata
Otholobium virgatum
Frankeniaceae
Frankenia pulverulenta
Fumariaceae
Cysticapnos vesicaria
Fumaria muralis
Gentianaceae
Orphium frutescens
Sebaea aurea
Sebaea albens
Geraniaceae
Pelargonium gibbosum
Erodium moschatum
Geranium incanum
Pelargonium capitatum
Pelargonium cucullatum
Pelargonium senecioides
Geranium molle
Pelargonium hirtum
Pelargonium myrrhifolium
Pelargonium triste
Haemodoraceae
Wachendorfia paniculata
Hyacinthaceae
Albuca maxima
Ornithogalum flaccida (albuca flaccida)
Lachenalia pallida
Ornithogalum hispidum
Ornithogalum thyrsoides
Albuca fragrans
Drimia filifolia
Lachenalia contaminata
Lachenalia reflexa
Hypoxidaceae
Spiloxene aquatica
Spiloxene capensis
Iridaceae
Babiana ambigua
Babiana ringens
Babiana tubulosa
Chasmanthe aethiopica (suurkanol)
Ferraria crispa
Ferraria crispa
Ferraria divaricata
Gladiolus cunonius
Gladiolus griseus
Gladiolus undulatus
Lapeirousia anceps
Melasphaerula ramosa
Micranthus junceus
Moraea flaccida
Moraea fugax
Moraea miniata
Moraea setifolia
Romulea flava
Romulea obscura
Romulea tabularis
Sparaxis bulbifera
Gladiolus carinatus (blou Afrikaner)
Aristea africana
Geissorhiza aspera
Geissorhiza tenella
Ixia paniculata
Moraea gawleri
Romulea hirsuta
Romulea schlechteri
Watsonia meriana
Juncaceae
Juncus kraussii
Juncus kraussii
Juncaginaceae
Triglochin bulbosa
Lamiaceae
Salvia lanceolata
Salvia africana-lutea
Lauraceae
Cassytha ciliolata
Lemnaceae
Lemna gibba
Lemna minor
Lobeliaceae
Lobelia sp.1
Monopsis lutea
Monopsis simplex
Malvaceae
Hermannia multiflora
Hermannia pinnata
Hermannia procumbens
Malva parviflora
Hermannia linifolia
Hermannia procumbens procumbens
Melianthaceae
Melianthus major
Menispermaceae
Cissampelos capensis
Mesembryanthemaceae
Carpobrotus edulis
Ruschia macowanii
Ruschia serrulata
Ruschia tumidula
Carpobrotus acinaciformis
Conicosia pugioniformis
Drosanthemum floribundum
Lampranthus aureus
Lampranthus multiradiatus
Lampranthus sociorum
Mesembryanthemum crystallinum
Disphyma crassifolium
Carpanthea pomeridiana
Lampranthus amoenus
Lampranthus calcaratus
Lampranthus explanatus
Lampranthus glaucus
Lampranthus reptans
Lampranthus stenus
Phyllobolus canaliculatus
Ruschia geminiflora
Molluginaceae
Pharnaceum lineare
Myoporaceae
Myoporum tetrandrum
Myricaceae
Morella cordifolia
Morella quercifolia
Neuradaceae
Grielum grandiflorum
Oleaceae
Olea capensis
Olea europaea africana
Onagraceae
Ludwigia adscendens diffusa
Orchidaceae
Corycium crispum
Corycium orobanchoides
Satyrium odorum
Satyrium bicorne
Acrolophia bolusii
Disa bracteata
Holothrix villosa
Pterygodium catholicum
Satyrium coriifolium
Orobanchaceae
Harveya squamosa
Oxalidaceae
Oxalis compressa
Oxalis hirta
Oxalis luteola
Oxalis obtusa
Oxalis pes-caprae
Oxalis purpurea
Oxalis pusilla
Plantaginaceae
Plantago coronopus
Plantago crassifolia
Plantago lanceolata
Plantago crassifolia
Plumbaginaceae
Limonium equisetinum
Limonium scabrum
Poaceae
Ehrharta villosa
Ammophila arenaria
Cladoraphis cyperoides
Cynodon dactylon (couch grass; kweekgras; kweek)
Cynosurus echinatus
Ehrharta calycina
Ehrharta longiflora
Lolium multiflorum (Italian ryegrass; annual ryegrass)
Lolium rigidum
Pennisetum macrourum
Phragmites australis
Sporobolus virginicus
Stenotaphrum secundatum (buffalo grass)
Thinopyrum distichum
Bromus diandrus (ripgut brome; predikantsluis)
Paspalum distichum
Polygalaceae
Nylandtia spinosa (skilpadbessie bos), (tortoise berry bush)
Polygala myrtifolia
Muraltia satureioides
Polygonaceae
Persicaria decipiens
Persicaria lapathifolia
Rumex crispus
Rumex lativalvis
Rumex sagittatus
Potamogetonaceae
Potamogeton pectinatus
Proteaceae
Leucadendron levisanus (Cape flats conebush)
Ranunculaceae
Ranunculus rionii
Restionaceae
Thamnochortus sp.1
Willdenowia incurvata
Elegia tectorum
Ischyrolepis eleocharis
Thamnochortus spicigerus
Calopsis rigorata
Elegia verreauxii
Thamnochortus erectus
Rhamnaceae
Phylica ericoides
Phylica cephalantha
Phylica parviflora
Rosaceae
Cliffortia falcata
Cliffortia stricta
Cliffortia ericifolia
Cliffortia hirta
Rubiaceae
Anthospermum spathulatum
Galium tomentosum
Ruppiaceae
Ruppia maritima
Rutaceae
Diosma aspalathoides
Sapotaceae
Sideroxylon inerme
Scrophulariaceae
Diascia capensis
Hebenstretia cordata
Hebenstretia repens
Hemimeris racemosa
Lyperia lychnidea
Lyperia tristis
Manulea tomentosa
Nemesia versicolor
Phyllopodium cephalophorum
Hemimeris sabulosa
Nemesia affinis
Zaluzianskya villosa
Dischisma capitatum
Hebenstretia dentata
Manulea rubra
Nemesia ligulata
Solanaceae
Solanum guineense
Datura ferox
Lycium afrum
Lycium ferocissimum
Lycium horridum
Solanum americanum
Solanum linnaeanum
Sterculiaceae
Hermannia procumbens
Tecophilaeaceae
Cyanella hyacinthoides
Thymelaeaceae
Passerina corymbosa
Passerina ericoides
Passerina rigida
Gnidia spicata
Lachnaea grandiflora
Struthiola striata
Typhaceae
Typha capensis (bulrush), (papkuil)
Viscaceae
Viscum capense
Zygophyllaceae
Zygophyllum flexuosum
Zygophyllum morgsana
Zygophyllum sessilifolium

Introduced 
Agavaceae
Agave sisalana (sisal)
Anacardiaceae
Schinus terebinthifolius (Brazilian pepper)
Araceae
Pistia stratiotes (water lettuce)
Asteraceae
Senecio pterophorus
Azollaceae
Azolla filiculoides (red water fern)
Boraginaceae
Echium plantagineum
Cactaceae
Opuntia ficus-indica
Commelinaceae
Commelina benghalensis (Blouselblommetjie), (Benghal dayflower)
Fabaceae
Acacia cyclops (Rooikrans)
Acacia saligna (Port Jackson)
Paraserianthes lophantha
Sesbania punicea
Vicia benghalensis
Vicia sativa
Haloragaceae
Myriophyllum aquaticum
Lythraceae
Lythrum salicaria
Malvaceae
Lavatera arborea
Moraceae
Ficus natalensis
Myoporaceae
Myoporum tenuifolium (manatoka)
Myrtaceae
Eucalyptus grandis
Eucalyptus lehmannii
Eucalyptus gomphocephala
Poaceae
Arundo donax
Avena fatua (common wild oat)
Avena sativa
Avena sp.1
Cortaderia selloana (pampas grass)
Lolium perenne
Paspalum vaginatum
Pennisetum clandestinum (Kikuyu grass)
Pennisetum setaceum
Pontederiaceae
Eichhornia crassipes (water hyacinth)

References 

Nature reserves in Cape Town
Protected areas of the Western Cape